Blaize Bailey is a small hamlet and viewpoint on the eastern edge of the Forest of Dean, in Gloucestershire, England.

The viewpoint was constructed using stone from a disused railway bridge at nearby Fetter Hill. It overlooks a horseshoe bend in the River Severn and, on a fine day, it is possible to see Gloucester Cathedral, Newnham on Severn and the Cotswold Hills.

References

External links
360° view of Blaize Bailey
Official Forest of Dean website

Villages in Gloucestershire
Forest of Dean